George Reynolds (died 1577), of Devizes, Wiltshire, was an English politician.

He was a Member (MP) of the Parliament of England for Devizes in 1572.

References

Year of birth missing
1577 deaths
People from Devizes
English MPs 1572–1583